Phoenix is the fourth studio album by Finnish power metal band Dreamtale.

Track listing
 "Yesterday's News" – 3:33
 "Eyes of the Clown" – 4:43
 "Payback" – 4:44
 "Failed States" – 3:49
 "Take What the Heavens Create" – 2:53
 "Great Shadow" – 5:15
 "No Angels No More" – 3:46
 "Faceless Men" – 4:16
 "Firebird" – 3:47
 "The Vigilante" – 4:46
 "Lady Dragon" (Bonus Track) – 4:15
 "Between Love and Hate" (Bonus Track) - 4:05

Credits 
Erkki Seppänen - vocals
Rami Keränen - Guitar
Seppo Kolehmainen - Guitar
Akseli Kaasalainen - keyboards
Pasi Ristolainen - Bass
Arto Pitkänen - drums

2008 albums
Dreamtale albums
Spinefarm Records albums